The 2010 Chesapeake Bayhawks season was the 10th season for the Chesapeake Bayhawks of the Major League Lacrosse, and their 1st season as Chesapeake. The Bayhawks won their 3rd Steinfeld Cup, despite entering the playoffs as the lowest seed.

Regular season

Standings 
W = Wins, L = Losses, PCT = Winning Percentage, GB = Games Back of first place, GF = Goals For, 2ptGF = 2 point Goals For, GA = Goals Against, 2ptGA = 2 point Goals Against

Schedule

Postseason 
Ranked the 4th seed heading into the 2010 MLL playoffs, Chesapeake upset #1 Boston in the semifinals 13-9, and defeated Long Island in the MLL championship 13-9 again for the Steinfeld Cup.

Playoff Bracket

Semifinal: Boston

Final: Long Island

See also 
2010 MLL season
Chesapeake Bayhawks

References

External links

Chesapeake Bayhawks seasons
2010 in lacrosse
Chesapeake Bayhawks